Anostomoides is a small genus of fish in the family Anostomidae that are found in South America.

Species
Anostomoides atrianalis, Pellegrin, 1909
Anostomoides laticeps, (C. H. Eigenmann, 1912)
Anostomoides passionis, Dos Santos & Zuanon, 2006

References
 
 

Anostomidae
Taxa named by Jacques Pellegrin
Fish of South America